Estadio Municipal de Lo Barnechea is a stadium in Lo Barnechea, Santiago. It's Barnechea's home stadium.

The stadium holds 2,500 people.

The first football match played in the played in the stadium was a 0–0 draw between Barnechea and Deportes Iberia.

References

Sports venues in Santiago
M